Cymindis gottelandi is a species of ground beetle in the subfamily Harpalinae. It was described by Paulian & Villiars in 1939.

References

gottelandi
Beetles described in 1939